Villand may refer to:

Villand, hundred of Sweden. See List of hundreds of Sweden

People with the surname
Kiino Villand, American photographer

See also
Villandi, village in Estonia